Wayne Cook (1949) is an American keyboardist best known for his time with Steppenwolf and Player.  He co-wrote the instrumental "Lip Service" and played keyboards on Steppenwolf's 1976 Skullduggery album. The following year, he joined Player, appearing on their second album Danger Zone in 1978 and Room with a View in 1980.

Discography

GoodThunder (1971-1972)
GoodThunder (1972)

Bob "Catfish" Hodge (1975)
Soap Opera's (1975)

Steppenwolf (1976-1977)
Skullduggery (1976)
The Lost Heritage Tapes (Recorded Sept. 1976, Released 1997; album titled as John Kay & Company)

Michael Cassidy (1977)
Nature's Secret (1977)

Stephen Sinclair (1977)
A+ (1977)

Player (1977-1978)
Danger Zone (1978)

Joanne MacKell (1978)
Joanne MacKell (1978)

References 

Living people
American rock keyboardists
1946 births
Steppenwolf (band) members
Player (band) members
20th-century American keyboardists